Pierre Moscovici (born 16 September 1957) is a French politician who served as the European Commissioner for Economic and Financial Affairs, Taxation and Customs from 2014 to 2019. He previously served as Minister of Finance from 2012 to 2014 and as Minister for European Affairs between 1997 and 2002.

Previously a member of the Trotskyist group the Revolutionary Communist League, Moscovici joined the French Socialist Party (PS) in 1984 and has since that time been a member of the Departmental Council of Doubs and of the French Parliament and the European Parliament. He has been National Secretary of his party since 1995.

In May 2014 he was entrusted by the Prime Minister of France with a six-month mission to assess how European policies can better contribute to growth and employment. In July 2014 French President François Hollande proposed him to be France's representative in the next European Commission. In September 2014, he was named as European Commissioner for Economic and Financial Affairs, Taxation and Customs by President-designate of the European Commission Jean-Claude Juncker.

Early life and education
Born in Paris, Moscovici is the son of the influential Romanian social psychologist Serge Moscovici and of the Polish psychoanalyst Marie Bromberg-Moscovici.

Moscovici obtained his Baccalauréat at the Lycée Condorcet in 1974, a DEA in economics and in philosophy, and he graduated from Sciences Po Paris and the École nationale d'administration, where he studied under Dominique Strauss-Kahn, who became a friend and mentor in politics. He was a president of À gauche en Europe, a group founded by Strauss-Kahn and Michel Rocard and also created his own group "Besoin de Gauche".

After graduating from the École nationale d'administration in 1984, Moscovici was appointed to the Cour des comptes – French Court of Audit -, of which he is currently a senior member.

Political career

Early political career
Initially active in the Revolutionary Communist League, he left in 1984 to join the PS and, in 1986, became secretary of the "experts' group" created by Claude Allègre.

In 1988, he moved on to the Ministry for National Education in Minister Lionel Jospin's cabinet, first as conseiller technique, then as chargé de mission.

From 1990 to 1994, he headed the Public Service Modernisation and Financing Department at the Commissariat général du Plan – French Planning Office.

Member of the European Parliament 
From 1994 to 1997, Moscovici was a Member of the European Parliament. In parliament, he served on the Committee on Economic and Monetary Affairs. In addition to his committee assignments, he was part of the Parliament's delegation for relations with the countries of Central America and Mexico.

Minister delegate for European Affairs 
Elected to the French Parliament from the Doubs département in 1997, he went on to become a Member of the Franche-Comté Regional Council from 1998 to 2004, and of the Doubs département General Council from 1994 to 2002.

From 1997 to 2002, Moscovici was Minister delegate for European Affairs in the government of Lionel Jospin. At the request of Chirac, he represented the French authorities at the Convention on the Future of Europe in 2002.

Member of the European Parliament 
On 20 July 2004, Moscovici was elected one of the 14 Vice-Presidents of the European Parliament and was re-elected on 17 January 2007. In addition, he served on the Committee on Foreign Affairs.

Of Romanian origin, he was one of the supporters of Romania's EU integration. He stated that he identifies itself as a half Romanian.

Member of the French National Assembly and Minister for Finance and Economy 
From 2007 to 2012, Moscovici was a Member of the French National Assembly (4th constituency in the Doubs), serving on the Committee on Foreign Affairs, and subsequently the Finance Committee. He also served as vice-president of the Assembly's Committee on European Affairs.

He was President of the Pays de Montbéliard Agglomération (PMA – Greater Montbéliard Authority) from 2008 to 2012.

In 2011, Moscovici endorsed François Hollande and ran his successful campaign for the 2012 French presidential election. In the subsequent legislative election, Moscovici was re-elected to the National Assembly from the 4th constituency in the Doubs.

Moscovici served as France's Minister for Finance and Economy from May 2012 to April 2014.

Moscovici served as a Member of the French National Assembly. In May 2014 he was entrusted by the Prime Minister of France with a six-month mission to assess how European policies can better contribute to growth and employment.

Commissioner for Economic and Financial Affairs, Taxation and Customs 
In July 2014 President Francois Hollande nominated Moscovici to be France's candidate for the European Commission led by Jean-Claude Juncker. Juncker subsequently nominated Moscovici as Commissioner for Economic and Financial Affairs, Taxation and Customs.

Moscovici served as Commissioner from 2014 until 2019. In this capacity, he was in charge of the application of the Stability and Growth Pact, as well as ensuring the economic soundness of Commission proposals and deepening the Economic and Monetary Union of the European Union to create the conditions for jobs, growth and investment, and encouraging further structural reforms. On taxation matters, he was responsible for developing a value added tax system at the European level, improving the functioning of the internal market in both direct and indirect taxation and fighting tax fraud and tax evasion. His responsibilities also included the development and management of an efficient European Union Customs Union.

By 2017, Moscovici openly advocated a fully formed eurozone finance minister, and admitted that he would be interested in that position. In the meantime, the as Commissioner for Economic and Financial Affairs, Taxation and Customs should also assume the presidency of the Eurogroup.

In a 2018 letter to Sergei Stanishev, then chairman of the Party of European Socialists (PES), Moscovici ruled himself out of the race to succeed Jean-Claude Juncker and become the Commission's next president, “due to profound disagreements with [the French Socialist Party’s] political line and strategy on Europe.”

Wiretapping by NSA
In 2015, WikiLeaks revealed that the U.S. National Security Agency wiretapped Moscovici’s communication during his time as Minister of Finance.

Overview

Governmental function
Minister of Economy and Finances, June 2012 – April 2014
Minister of Economy, Finances, and Foreign Trade, May 2012 – June 2012
Minister of European Affairs, 1997–2002.

Electoral mandates

European Parliament
Member of European Parliament, 1994–1997 (elected in the National Assembly of France in 1997, and became minister) 2004–2007 (Resignation, re-elected member of the National Assembly of France in 2007). Elected in 1994, re-elected in 2004.

National Assembly of France
Member of the National Assembly of France for Doubs, elected in 1997, but became minister in June) 2007–2012 (became minister in May). Elected in 1997, re-elected in 2007, 2012.

Regional Council
Regional councillor of Franche-Comté, 1998–2004.

General Council
General councillor of Doubs, 1994–2001.

Municipal Council
Municipal councillor of Valentigney, 2008–2014.
Municipal councillor of Montbéliard, 1995–2008. Re-elected in 2001.

Agglomeration community Council
President of the Agglomeration community of the Pays de Montbéliard, 2008–2012 (resignation).
Member of the Agglomeration community of the Pays de Montbéliard, 2008–2014.

Opinion
"We sincerely hope that Greece remains in the eurozone", Moscovici said.

See also
 Ireland as a tax haven
 Double Irish arrangement

References

External links

Personal blog

|-

|-

|-

1957 births
Living people
Lycée Condorcet alumni
Sciences Po alumni
École nationale d'administration alumni
Judges of the Court of Audit (France)
Eurogroup
French European Commissioners
French Ministers of Finance
French people of Romanian-Jewish descent
Government and politics articles needing translation from French Wikipedia
Government ministers of France
Jewish French politicians
MEPs for East France 2004–2009
Politicians from Paris
Recipients of the Order of the Cross of Terra Mariana, 1st Class
Revolutionary Communist League (France) politicians
Socialist Party (France) MEPs
Deputies of the 13th National Assembly of the French Fifth Republic
Deputies of the 14th National Assembly of the French Fifth Republic
European Commissioners 2014–2019